The 2005 10,000 Lakes Festival was held July 21 through July 24.

2005 Lineup

Widespread Panic             
Trey Anastasio               
The Black Crowes             
Les Claypool                 
G. Love & Special Sauce      
Rusted Root                  
Dark Star Orchestra          
Buckethead with Brain        
Particle                     
Everyone Orchestra with Steve Kimock
Sound Tribe Sector 9         
Jazz Mandolin Project        
MOFRO                        
Cyro Baptista                
Perpetual Groove  
Jacob Fred Jazz Odyssey      
Bockman                      
Green Lemon                  
Delta Nove                   
ALO                          
Bump
The Breakfast                
Trampled by Turtles          
Fat Maw Rooney               
Mr. Blotto                   
Signal Path                  
God Johnson                  
Grace Potter & The Nocturnals
Freshwater Collins  
New Primitives               
Hooch                        
Gabby La La                  
White Iron Band              
Turbine                      
Down Lo                      
Smokin Bandits               
56 Hope Road                 
T.U.G.G.                     
Madahoochi                   
Holy Moses & The High Rollers
Roadside Zoo   
Covert Operations

References

10,000 Lakes Festival
2005 in American music
2005 music festivals
10000